Pawapuri Road railway station is a railway station on the Bakhtiyarpur–Tilaiya line under the Danapur railway division of East Central Railway zone. It is situated beside Ranchi-Patna Road at Bijwanpar in Nalanda district in the Indian state of Bihar.

References 

Railway stations in Nalanda district
Danapur railway division